McMinnville is the county seat of and largest city in Yamhill County, Oregon, United States. The city is named after McMinnville, Tennessee. As of the 2020 census, the city had a population of 34,319.

McMinnville is at the confluence of the North and South forks of the Yamhill River in the Willamette Valley. The city's economy has both industry: Cascade Steel (a Schnitzer Steel Industries company), and service businesses: Oregon Mutual Insurance Company, the Woodworth Contrarian Hedge Fund. Linfield University provides higher education, including new degrees in wine studies. Attractions include Wings and Waves Water Park, Joe Dancer Park, and Evergreen Aviation & Space Museum, the home of Howard Hughes's famed Spruce Goose flying boat. The city identifies as a center of the well-developed wine industry in the Willamette Valley, which has hundreds of wineries and vineyards.

History

Town founder William T. Newby joined the Great Migration of 1843, of people from the eastern states to the west. He later claimed land in 1844 on the present site of McMinnville in what was known as the Oregon Country. He built a grist mill in 1853 at what would become the west end of Third Street. On May 5, 1856, Newby platted a town and named it after his hometown of McMinnville, Tennessee. Newby later made a substantial donation of land to support founding an institution of higher learning in the town. It was originally called McMinnville College but is known today as Linfield University.

McMinnville was incorporated as a town in 1876 and became a city in 1882. County residents voted to move the county seat of Yamhill County from Lafayette to McMinnville in 1886.

Geography

Climate
This region experiences warm (but not hot) and dry summers, with no average monthly temperatures above . Just 43 miles from the Pacific Coastal community of Lincoln City, McMinnville will often see a Marine Layer offering cool foggy days. A warm summer day makes a quick beach trip an ideal feature of living in McMinnville. According to the Köppen Climate Classification system, McMinnville has a warm-summer Mediterranean climate, abbreviated "Csb" on climate maps. Annual precipitation averages , with normal monthly precipitation peaking in November.

Demographics

2010 census
As of the census of 2010, there were 32,187 people, 11,674 households, and 7,779 families living in the city. The racial makeup of the city was 82.2% White, 0.7% African American, 1.2% Native American, 1.5% Asian, 0.2% Pacific Islander, 10.7% from other races, and 3.5% from two or more races. Hispanic or Latino of any race were 20.6% of the population.

There were 11,674 households, of which 35.5% had children under the age of 18 living with them, 48.2% were married couples living together, 13.0% had a female householder with no husband present, 5.4% had a male householder with no wife present, and 33.4% were non-families. 26.4% of all households were made up of individuals, and 12.4% had someone living alone who was 65 years of age or older. The average household size was 2.61 and the average family size was 3.14.

The median age in the city was 34 years. 25.8% of residents were under the age of 18; 12.7% were between the ages of 18 and 24; 24.7% were from 25 to 44; 22.2% were from 45 to 64; and 14.6% were 65 years of age or older. The gender makeup of the city was 48.2% male and 51.8% female.

2000 census
As of the census of 2000, there were 26,499 people living in the city, among 9,367 households and 6,463 families.  The population density was 2,675.8 people per square mile (1,033.5/km).  There were 9,834 housing units at an average density of 993.0 per square mile (383.5/km).  The racial makeup of the city was 86.39% White, 1.39% Native American, 1.25% Asian, 0.68% Black or African American, and 0.18% Pacific Islander.  14.64% of the population were Hispanic or Latino of any race. 7.26% identify themselves as from other races, and 2.86% from two or more races.

There were 9,367 households, out of which 35.4% had children under the age of 18 living with them, 53.5% were married couples living together, 10.8% had a female householder with no husband present, and 31.0% were non-families. 23.9% of all households were made up of individuals, and 11.5% had someone living alone who was 65 years of age or older.  The average household size was 2.66 and the average family size was 3.13.

In the city, the population was spread out, with 26.3% under the age of 18, 14.7% from 18 to 24, 26.9% from 25 to 44, 17.9% from 45 to 64, and 14.3% who were 65 years of age or older.  The median age was 32 years.  For every 100 females, there were 93.7 males.  For every 100 females age 18 and over, there were 90.6 males.

The median income for a household in the city was $38,953, and the median income for a family was $44,013. Males had a median income of $33,517 versus $24,405 for females. The per capita income for the city was $17,085. 12.9% of the population and 8.2% of families were below the poverty line.  Out of the total population, 14.0% of those under the age of 18 and 7.8% of those 65 and older were living below the poverty line.

Economy
Michelbook Country Club, a private 18-hole par 72 championship golf course, was developed on the farmland of Captain Francis Michelbook. Land development in the area of the country club has been a factor in McMinnville's growth in the late 20th century. In the early 1960s, Kelton Peery, Chuck Colvin and Willard Cushing believed it was time for the city to have a private golf course and began to search for property. They soon persuaded Captain Francis Michelbook, former Commander of the Oregon National Guard’s Third Infantry Company A, that a country club would be the proper use for his land. Captain Michelbook established certain conditions: the country club would bear his family name "Michelbook". The country club has a driving range, practice facility, golf shop and a Class A PGA Professional. 

In 2019 the Oregon International Air Show was moved to the McMinnville Municipal Airport. The annual airshow promotes aviation and honors the US military and veterans. It attracts numerous attendees and related economic activity. In addition, the Air Show sponsors involve their community; grants are provided to the host city. Since 1988 the Air Show has generated more than $3 million in donations to McMinnville (Yamhill County), Hillsboro (Washington County), Oregon and southwest Washington.  The U.S. Air Force Thunderbirds were to be showcased in the 2021 Oregon International Air Show at the McMinnville Airport in July and August.

McMinnville has a wide-array of banking, credit unions, and options for investments. First Federal Savings and Loan Association headquarters in McMinnville was founded in 1922. The city has brick-and-mortar locations for many of the largest national banks in the United States including Wells Fargo, JP Morgan Chase, KeyBank, and US Bank. 

Credit unions have been increasing membership in McMinnville - for instance the Oregon State Credit Union, established in 1919. It has made donations to the elementary and middle-school travel baseball program of the city. OnPoint Community Credit Union, founded as Portland Teachers Credit Union, has a branch in McMinnville. OnPoint Community Credit Union provides funding and foundational investments in the McMinnville Education Foundation and McMinnville Music Boosters. The downtown area also offers branch locations for Federal Reserve Non-Member Banks, Citizens Bank and Columbia Bank.

Founded in 1894, Oregon Mutual Insurance is located in downtown McMinnville. 

Since the late 20th century, winemaking has been developed throughout the Willamette Valley: as of 2021 there are 597 wineries in the valley and 764 vineyards. The majority of the vineyards of the Willamette Valley American Viticultural Area (AVA) are in the area surrounding McMinnville. It identifies as the capital of Oregon's wine industry. 

In January 2005, a McMinnville AVA was established after an application from Youngberg Hill Vineyards. The AVA includes 14 wineries and  within the Willamette Valley AVA.  The city is at the northeastern border of its AVA namesake. Linfield University expanded to offer a B.A. or B.S. in wine studies. 

McMinnville also has local breweries making craft beers, often associated with pubs. McMinnville is home to 6 craft breweries, including 2 gluten-free breweries.

Traditional industry includes Cascade Steel, which specializes in producing high-quality finished steel products from recycled steel. Cascade Steel Rolling Mills uses electric arc furnace (EAF) mini-mill production for a wide range of hot rolled products including rebar, coiled reinforcing bar, wire rod, and merchant bar. Cascade Steel operates as a subsidiary of Schnitzer Steel, a publicly -traded Fortune 1000 company. 

In 2016, Organic Valley purchased Farmers Cooperative Creamery in McMinnville. It serves 72 co-op members in Oregon and Washington. The company claims to be the nation's largest farmer-owned organic cooperative and one of the world's largest organic consumer brands. In 2021 a massive 3-alarm fire decimated the McMinnville Creamery, forcing residents to evacuate a 1/2-mile radius.

Arts and culture

Annual cultural events
Turkey Rama is a three-day festival held in downtown McMinnville celebrating the ongoing tradition of the turkey barbecue. The barbecue was started in 1938 by turkey farmers in Yamhill County when the county's main source of wealth was the turkey-farming industry. Today, commercial exhibitions have replaced the "turkey exhibitions", and the turkey-judging competitions and turkey races have been eliminated in favor of more "turkey-friendly" rides, booths, and outdoor entertainment.

The International Pinot Noir Celebration has been held every July since 1987 on the Linfield University campus. The IPNC is a three-day event in which winemakers, northwest chefs, media, epicures and wine lovers gather at Linfield University.

In 2018, the McMinnville Noon Rotary Club partnered with the Willamette Valley Cancer Foundation for an annual event promoting McMinnville community projects culminating the MAC Food Truck Festival. The festival is a celebration of local businesses and the best food trucks of Oregon while showcasing the wide array of beer and wine scene of the Willamette Valley. Hagan Hamilton, Lum's Buick GMC Cadillac, Citizens Bank, Hyder Dental, Oregon Oncology, Willamette Valley Medical Center, Online NW, Recology, Morris Carpet Cleaning, and Physicians Medical Center are sponsors.

Established in 1993, the Sip! McMinnville Wine & Food Classic is a three-day event held at the Evergreen Aviation and Space Museum benefiting the St. James School of McMinnville. It features local winemakers and vintners alongside chefs from the Pacific Northwest, and attendees can taste and purchase wine and food.

Museums and other points of interest

Wings & Waves Waterpark is an indoor, all-season waterpark that includes ten waterslides, ranging from slides for the little ones to slides for daredevils, and a fun wave pool. Slide out of a real Boeing 747 aircraft sitting on the roof, and enjoy an awesome day of fun. The nearby Evergreen Aviation and Space Museum is best known as the home of the Spruce Goose, the world's largest propeller-driven seaplane, built by the famed aviator Howard Hughes. 

The museum, home to another 80 historic aircraft and exhibits, is a pair of large symmetrical buildings with glass facades, a local landmark which can be seen for miles. Additional major exhibits include a SR-71 "Blackbird", a Titan II SLV Missile (with its launch control center), and a Grumman F6F3 "Hellcat." There is also an "IMAX class" digital 3D theater, the Wings & Waves indoor waterpark (containing wave pool, 4 slides emerging from 747 on building's roof, and educational displays), and the newly built Boy Scout Jamboree park.

The Yamhill Valley Heritage Center Museum - Located just outside of downtown McMinnville at the intersection of HWY 18 and Durham Lane. One of 2 museums operated by the Yamhill County Historical Society striving to protect, preserve and share the heritage of Yamhill County www.YamhillCountyHistory.org

Featuring a working Blacksmith Shop, Sawmill, Steam Traction Engine, Hutchcroft School House, Logging and Dairy Displays and Educational Programs.  The Museum hosts many annual events including Farm Fest in early April and Harvest Fest in mid August.

Parks and recreation
McMinnville Community Center is headquarters for the McMinnville Parks and Recreation Department, which administers 18 parks throughout the city. The largest city park is the 100-acre sports field complex and community park named after a longtime city manager Joe Dancer. The city of McMinnville administers youth sports leagues in both baseball and basketball, along with many other competitive sports.

For instance, Joe Dancer Park has a dozen baseball and softball fields. The park also features soccer fields, playground equipment, and the Drew Ottley Memorial Skate Park. Discovery Meadows Community Park also has a skate park, along with baseball and softball fields. This 22-acre community park has picnic shelters (available to rent), playgrounds, play structure w/towers, climbing walls, climbing boulders, water features, basketball courts, and walking pathways (1 mile paved) and trails (.95 mile soft) throughout. 

City Park is within walking distance from the downtown business district. It opened in 1910, when the city sold $3,000 in park bonds to finance construction of a bandstand and a small zoo featuring bears, deer and other regional animals. Near the site of Lower City Park, the large flour mill, Star Mill, operated until 1921. After the remaining structure was damaged by fire in 1927, the city sold $8,500 in bonds to finance purchase of the property. The tract ran from Star Mill Way to Cozine Creek and West Second Street, to the mill pond site. The pond site was redeveloped as city tennis courts. 

Wortman Park is a large forested park with a small stream running through it. A disc golf course was installed 1991 and is home to the annual Squirrel Open, an Oregon Disc Sports Association's Oregon Series tournament. 

Since 1956 the McMinnville Parks and Recreation Department has overseen the Aquatic Center, which includes two indoor swimming pools, a hot tub, and Fitness Center. The Aquatic Center is used by the McMinnville High School Grizzly Swim Team and the McMinnville Swim Club. The city parks department also partners with Chemeketa Community College, whose students may earn college credits through use of the Aquatic Center.

Education
Along with several private schools, the city enjoys a growing school district and two Institutions of Higher Education (IHE), Chemeketa Community College and Linfield University. 

In 1858, Linfield University was founded as Baptist College of McMinnville. Later renamed McMinnville College and then Linfield College, in 2020 the Board of Trustees renamed the school Linfield University. Linfield is an independent, comprehensive institution of higher education for undergraduate and graduate studies in 56 unique majors. The University enrolls roughly 2,000 students from 24 states with nearly 95% of students utilizing financial aid. 

Linfield University is located on nearly 200 acres with over 60 facilities. The Linfield University athletic program is part of the Northwest Conference, NCAA Division III rostering varsity sports, along with intercollegiate sports and activities. In 2020 the football program upgraded their facility with the largest scoreboard in NCAA Division III. The 1,800 square foot display measures in at 60 feet wide and 30 feet high. The football program notched it's 64th consecutive winning season in 2019. 

In the mid to late 70's community locations for Chemeketa Community College expanded to McMinnville. Chemeketa Yamhill Valley received accreditation as a college campus in the fall of 2011 and McMinnville became the home of the second multi-campus community college in the state of Oregon. The Yamhill Valley campus provides numerous services including; academic advising, counseling support services, student clubs and activities, student accessibility services, library/tutoring centers, open computer labs, testing services, bookstore, conditioning/fitness center, and cafe/coffee shop. The campus is also set up to issue student identifications and has WI-FI available in the parking lot.

Nearly two decades after McMinnville College was founded, the city of McMinnville levied a tax to build the first public school house. The McMinnville School District is responsible for the education of nearly 7,000 K-12 school children. The McMinnville School District superintendent is Debbie Brocket. The largest high school of the county, McMinnville High School (MHS), has an enrollment of over 2,000 students. 

Along with MHS, the school district offers two middle schools and five elementary schools in the city. Children from outside of the city limits and unincorporated areas of Yamhill County attend McMinnville City Schools. The school district also bears the burden of oversight, administration, and maintenance of Wascher Elementary in the nearby community of Lafayette, Oregon.

Private schools in McMinnville include the McMinnville Montessori School, McMinnville Christian Academy (MCA) and St. James Catholic Elementary School. Each private school offers a unique experience for students and parents. The McMinnville Montessori School provides before and after school care utilizing Joe Dancer and City Parks. McMinnville Christian Academy provides pre-school education all the way through middle-school. Additionally, MCA provide cost-effective and superior after-school programs. St James Catholic Elementary School recently implemented multi-age learning in all classrooms where students will stay with the same teacher over a period of two years. The school provides excellent activities through numerous fundraisers working in concert with community partners.

Media
McMinnville Community Media
News Register - County Newspaper
KKJC-LP 93.5 FM - Christian talk radio operated by Calvary Chapel of McMinnville
KLYC 1260 AM
KSLC 90.3 FM - Linfield University student radio
The Linfield Review - The student news site for Linfield University
The Bruin - McMinnville High School student paper

Infrastructure

Transportation
Oregon Highway 18 is also known as Three Mile Lane from its McMinnville city center interchange east to the McMinnville Municipal Airport. The southern end of Oregon Route 47 is just northeast of city limits and connects McMinnville with Washington County.

Major thoroughfares in McMinnville are Highway 99W and Adams and Baker Streets which form a north–south couplet through the center of the town; Lafayette Avenue (which was at one time the route of U.S. Highway 99W), East Third Street (the main street through the downtown core), and West Second Street (the main street connecting downtown with the western residential areas). Baker Creek Road, Evans Street, Riverside Drive, South Davis Street, Fellows Street, Cypress Street and Booth Bend Road are also important collector streets connecting industrial or residential areas with the downtown core or the primary arterial streets.

McMinnville Municipal Airport is owned and operated by the City of McMinnville.

The Portland & Western Railroad serves McMinnville on its Westside Branch. Major railroad shippers include Cascade Steel Rolling Mills, Land O'Lakes Purina LLC, RB Rubber Products and McMinnville Gas. P&W maintains a depot in downtown McMinnville, itself a remnant from the Red Electric interurban passenger service which served McMinnville from 1914–1929. McMinnville is a hub for P&W, with trains operating between McMinnville and Newberg, Willamina, Dallas and Albany.

Historically, McMinnville had a landing for riverboats traveling up the Yamhill River. The Yamhill Lock near Lafayette helped facilitate river navigation up to McMinnville. However, the use of the Yamhill River for commercial purposes was short-lived; the city's only recreational boat dock has been unusable for years. River levels are unpredictable and difficult for boaters (water levels can be very high in winter and very low in summer).

Public Transit is provided by the Yamhill County Transit Area.  Three city routes provide Monday–Friday service starting at 6:30 AM and continuing through 7:50 PM. A Saturday "Loop" runs from 10:00 AM through 6:00 PM. YCTA also provides intercity service to all communities in Yamhill County on four different routes; hourly weekday and infrequent Saturday service to Newberg and Tigard, and weekday commuter trips to Hillsboro and Salem.

Intercity bus service is also provided by Caravan Airport Transportation and Valley Retriever between Portland and Newport, each with one daily trip in each direction stopping in McMinnville. Greyhound Bus formerly served McMinnville until 2004 with a stop on its Portland–San Francisco route, ending nearly 80 years of service on the route dating back to the Southern Pacific Railroad's rail and bus passenger service.

Electricity and Water
Since 1888, the city has been served by McMinnville Water and Light, a municipal utility. Economic development experts cite low utility rates as an important recruiting effort with McMinnville offering the 2nd lowest electricity rates and the 3rd lowest water rates in the entire state.

Health care
Willamette Valley Medical Center, along the outskirts of McMinnville, is an 88-bed acute-care, full-service facility, accredited by The Joint Commission.

Notable people

Whitney Blake - Actress and mother of actress Meredith Baxter Birney
Scott Brosius - Major League Baseball (MLB) World Series MVP Award-winning baseball player
Jim Bunn - Oregon politician
Troy Calhoun - NCAA Football Head Coach, Air Force
Pat Casey - Oregon State University NCAA Baseball Head Coach
Catt family - 21st Century bank-robbing family
Beverly Cleary - Children's author, National Book Award and Newbery Medal recipient
Verne Duncan - Oregon and Idaho politician
Matthew Haughey - Noted blogger
Bill Krueger - Major League Baseball (MLB) and Senior Baseball Analyst for Root Sports Northwest
Elgen Long – Aviator, researcher and author
Ehren McGhehey - Jackass cast member
Joe Paterson - Major League Baseball (MLB) pitcher for Arizona Diamondbacks
Ad Rutschman - College Football Hall of Fame Coach
Ross Shafer - Comedian, television host, and motivational speaker
Raemer Schreiber - Physics pioneer who worked at Los Alamos during WWII
Charlie Sitton - Former National Basketball Association (NBA) professional basketball player
Will Vinton - Oscar-winning director and producer of animated films

McMinnville UFO photographs 
McMinnville is well known among UFO buffs and researchers for photographs originally published on the front page of the June 9, 1950 edition of the city's newspaper, the News-Register (then known as the Telephone-Register), reportedly of an unidentified flying object; the photographs were taken nearly a month earlier, on May 11, 1950 at the farm of Paul and Evelyn Trent. The Oregonian published the photographs the next day, and within a month they were published in LIFE magazine.

Although these images have come to be known as the "McMinnville UFO photographs", the Trent farm was actually located in Sheridan, Oregon, around nine miles (15 km) southwest of McMinnville. The heated debate which followed between UFO researchers and skeptics made the town's name famous and has spurred an annual "UFO Festival" in McMinnville, the second largest such gathering in the United States to that of Roswell, New Mexico.

References

External links

 Entry for McMinnville from the Oregon Blue Book

 Visit McMinnville

 
Cities in Oregon
County seats in Oregon
Populated places established in 1876
Portland metropolitan area
Willamette Valley
Cities in Yamhill County, Oregon
1876 establishments in Oregon